Bowens Mill is an unincorporated community in Ben Hill County, in the U.S. state of Georgia.

History
The community was named after R. V. Bowen, the proprietor of a local gristmill. A post office called Bowens Mill was established in 1894, and remained in operation until 1906. A variant name was "Bowensville".

References

Unincorporated communities in Ben Hill County, Georgia
Unincorporated communities in Georgia (U.S. state)